The ninth season of the American animated television series SpongeBob SquarePants, created by animator and former marine biologist Stephen Hillenburg, originally aired on Nickelodeon in the United States from July 21, 2012, to February 20, 2017, and contained 26 half-hour episodes. The series chronicles the exploits and adventures of the title character and his various friends in the fictional underwater city of Bikini Bottom. The season was executive produced by series creator Hillenburg and writer Paul Tibbitt, the latter of whom also acted as the showrunner for the first 11 episodes of the season. Starting with "Lost in Bikini Bottom", Marc Ceccarelli and Vincent Waller became the supervising producers and showrunners and served in that position for the rest of the season. 

This season marks the show's transition to 1080i HDTV by now having episodes produced and aired in widescreen (16:9), the native aspect ratio of high-definition.

The season was first announced on January 3, 2011. A total of 26 episodes were produced for the season, bringing the number of episodes up to 204. The ninth season is the longest-running season of SpongeBob SquarePants to date, airing for four and a half years. The SpongeBob SquarePants: The Complete Ninth Season DVD was released in region 1 on October 10, 2017, and region 4 on October 7, 2020.

Production
The season's executive producers were series creator Stephen Hillenburg and Paul Tibbitt, who also acted as the series' showrunner. During production of the eighth season, Deadline Hollywood reported on January 3, 2011, that Nickelodeon had renewed the series for a ninth season, with 26 episodes in order, which would push the series over the 200th episode mark. SpongeBob SquarePants became the sixth Nickelodeon series with most episodes, surpassing Rugrats with 172 episodes, having 178 after the eighth season had completed broadcast on television.

On July 21, 2012, the season premiered with the episode "Extreme Spots"/"Squirrel Record" during a SpongeBob SquarePants television marathon event called "The Super Spongy Square Games". The episode "Extreme Spots" was written by Luke Brookshier, Marc Ceccarelli, and Derek Iversen, while Tom Yasumi served as animation director. It was guest starred by actor Johnny Knoxville. Moreover, "Squirrel Record" was written by Brookshier, Ceccarelli and Iversen, and Alan Smart served as animation director. During the television event, Nickelodeon also debuted – "Face Freeze!" and "Demolition Doofus" – of the eighth season.
The animation took place in South Korea at Rough Draft Studios. The animators pushed the animation to make it funnier and changed the theme song. Production also switched to high-definition in the season; the first episode "Extreme Spots", aired July 21, 2012. Episodes were written by a team of writers, which consisted of Casey Alexander, Josh Androsky, Brookshier, Ceccarelli, Zeus Cervas, Daniel Dominguez, Solomon Georgio, Andrew Goodman, Iversen, Clare O'Kane, Kyle McCulloch, Mr. Lawrence, Blake Lemons, Jack Pendarvis, and Kaz. The season was storyboarded by Alexander, Chris Allison, Ed Baker, Brookshier, Bob Camp, Ceccarelli, Cervas, Ryan Kramer, Chong Lee, Blake Lemons, Brian Morante, Lynne Naylor, Shellie O'Brien, Fred Osmond, Howie Perry, John Trabbic, and Joe Wierenga. The animation directors were Alan Smart and Tom Yasumi. This is the first season to be produced in high-definition.

According to an interview with Princess Grace Foundation-USA, creator Stephen Hillenburg said he would return for the show following production on the second film.

Season nine resumed when a new two-segment episode led into the 2015 Kids' Choice Sports on July 16, 2015; Viacom claimed at the beginning of the year that several new episodes would premiere over the summer of 2015, but only "Lost in Bikini Bottom"/"Tutor Sauce" and "Squid Plus One"/"The Executive Treatment" aired before the end of Labor Day on September 7, which is the effective end of Nickelodeon's summer season. During this season, the series diverged from its long-standing storyboard-driven writing format (in which the storyboard artists write the episodes as they draw its storyboard), instead opting for a script-driven format. In October 2015, Vincent Waller and Marc Ceccarelli took Paul Tibbitt's place as showrunner.

Cast 

The ninth season featured Tom Kenny as the voice of the title character SpongeBob SquarePants and his pet snail Gary. SpongeBob's best friend, a starfish named Patrick Star, was voiced by Bill Fagerbakke, while Rodger Bumpass played the voice of Squidward Tentacles, an arrogant and ill-tempered octopus. Other members of the cast were Clancy Brown as Mr. Krabs, a miserly crab obsessed with money who's SpongeBob's boss at the Krusty Krab; Mr. Lawrence as Plankton, a small green copepod and Mr. Krabs' business rival; Jill Talley as Karen, Plankton's sentient computer sidekick; Carolyn Lawrence as Sandy Cheeks, a squirrel from Texas; Mary Jo Catlett as Mrs. Puff, SpongeBob's boating school teacher; and Lori Alan as Pearl, a teenage whale who is Mr. Krabs' daughter.

In addition to the regular cast members, episodes feature guest voices from many ranges of professions, including actors, musicians, and artists. For instance, the season premiere "Extreme Spots" was guest starred by American stunt performer and Jackass actor Johnny Knoxville voicing the character of Johnny Krill. The writing staff wrote the episode specifically for Knoxville. Executive producer Paul Tibbitt said, "[Nickelodeon] wanted to do a show about extreme sports and the first thing that came to mind was Johnny Knoxville, because there are few humans living that are as extreme as him." Knoxville accepted the role because he is a fan of the show. 

Ernest Borgnine and Tim Conway returned, reprising their respective roles as Mermaid Man and Barnacle Boy in "Patrick-Man!". The episode was Borgnine's last voice-over work for the series as, on July 8, 2012, he died at the age of 95. The episode also marked as being Conway's final voice-over work for the series before his death on May 14, 2019 at the age of 85, though he returned to the franchise as the voice of a seagull in The SpongeBob Movie: Sponge Out of Water, released in 2015. The characters were retired after this episode due to Borgnine's death prior to its release and have since been reduced to silent background cameos. In "License to Milkshake", comedian and Spinal Tap band member Michael McKean guest starred as the voice of Captain Frostymug. Rapper Biz Markie guest appeared as Kenny the Cat in the episode of the same name. In "The Executive Treatment", an American stage actor, comedian and director, Frank Ferrante, guest-starred as the voice of Stockholder Eel. In "Sanctuary!", former Price is Right host Bob Barker guest starred as the voice of Bob Barnacle. In "Mall Girl Pearl", comedian legend Betty White and Aubrey Plaza guest starred as the voices of Beatrice and Nocturna. In "Sharks vs. Pods", Michael McKean returned and he voiced a new different character, Lonnie the Shark, along with Henry Winkler and David Lander as Sharkface and Donnie the Shark. Jon Hamm guest starred in "Goodbye, Krabby Patty?" as the voice of the business executive Don Grouper.

Reception

Critical reception 
The season received positive reviews from media critics and fans. In a DVD review for a season release, Paul Mavis of DVD Talk was positive on the episode "Extreme Spots", writing "[It] gets big laughs from some very funny bits, including a motorcycle ripping off SpongeBob's arms, and SpongeBob's pathetic attempts at 'extreme jump roping' and 'extreme pillow fighting.'" However, the episode "Squirrel Record" was described by Mavis as "the weakest entry" on the set.

The episode "Gary's New Toy" received a nomination at the 2013 Golden Reel Awards for the Best Sound Editing – Sound Effects, Foley, Dialogue and ADR Animation in Television category. The show itself also received recognition. At the 40th Daytime Emmy Awards, the series was nominated for Outstanding Achievement in Sound Editing – Animation. The show won the 2013 Kids' Choice Awards for Favorite Cartoon, and the ASCAP Film and Television Awards for Top Television Series. At the BMI Film & TV Awards, the show won the BMI Cable Award. Sarah Noonan was nominated at the Artios Awards of the Casting Society of America, and the episode "Company Picnic" was nominated for an Emmy for "Outstanding Short-format Animated Program". The ninth season was also nominated for a Producer's Guild Award in 2017.

Political controversy 
In 2013, the episode "SpongeBob You're Fired" was criticized for its line that refers to the Supplemental Nutrition Assistance Program (Food Stamps benefit). During a scene from the episode, Patrick Star tried to show SpongeBob "the benefits of being unemployed", at which he said in response, "Unemployment may be fun for you, but I need to get a job." The scene was meant to demonstrate the title character's "eternal optimism and willingness to get back to work", and "do it in a way that's still funny and relatable". However, it was reported that political activists claim the "notorious line" as a "slam" to the Food Stamps benefit. In a report by The Hollywood Reporter, it stated there that the episode may have a political agenda about the social safety net. It added that "It's not the first time SpongeBob has waded into social commentary, though usually when it does, it bugs the right and supports the left." This incident sparked a political debate, after the New York Post and Fox News remarked on the episode. The Media Matters for America, a politically progressive media watchdog group, responded. According to the group, the attacking news media, both owned by News Corporation, were using the episode "to slam poor people who use social services". 

In response to Fox News, Media Matters immediately posted an item titled "Right-Wing Media Use SpongeBob SquarePants' Firing To Attack Social Safety Net", arguing that the talking heads "are using the firing of fictional cartoon character SpongeBob SquarePants to attack the social safety net and those who rely on it". The article said "Right-wing media have a long history of attacking the social safety net. Media Matters was "also particularly bothered by [a] line from The Post story: "Lest he sit around idly, mooching off the social services of Bikini Bottom, a depressed SpongeBob sets out to return to gainful employment wherever he can find it," reporter Andrea Morabito wrote. "No spoilers -- but it's safe to say that our hero doesn't end up on food stamps, as his patty-making skills turn out to be in high demand. Furthermore, the coverage from Fox News prompted civil rights activist, and talk show host Al Sharpton of MSNBC to "stick up for poor Americans". Sharpton remarked in the October 31 episode of PoliticsNation, "The right-wingers found a new hero in its war against the poor [...] SpongeBob SquarePants. That's right. SpongeBob SquarePants [...] So a sponge who lives in a pineapple under the sea doesn't need government help. That means no one does?"

Nickelodeon declined to comment on the issue caused by the message of the episode. However, Russell Hicks of Nickelodeon said the show is "tapping into the news of the moment, but did not specifically address any political leanings or ideologies within the episode". In a statement, Hicks said "Like all really great cartoons, part of SpongeBob's long-running success has been its ability to tap into the zeitgeist while still being really funny for our audience. As always, despite this momentary setback, SpongeBob's eternal optimism prevails, which is always a great message for everyone."

Episodes 

The episodes are ordered below according to Nickelodeon's packaging order, and not their original production or broadcast order.

DVD release
The DVD boxset for season nine was released by Paramount Home Entertainment and Nickelodeon in the United States and Canada on October 10, 2017, eight months after the season had completed broadcast on television. The DVD release features bonus materials, including "animated shorts".

Notes

References

External links 
 Season 9 at Metacritic

2012 American television seasons
2013 American television seasons
2014 American television seasons
2015 American television seasons
2016 American television seasons
2017 American television seasons
SpongeBob SquarePants seasons